Irandoost or Irandust is a surname which means "Iran-loving" in Persian.

People 
Notable people with the surname include:
Nosrat Irandoost (born 1949), Iranian footballer
Maryam Irandoost (born 1979), Iranian footballer
Daleho Irandust (born 1998), Swedish footballer

Persian-language surnames